Eschati (Εσχάτη) is an uninhabited island, lying to southwest of Santorini, in the Cyclades island group in Greece.

Cyclades
Islands of the South Aegean
Islands of Greece